Accardi is an Italian surname. Notable people with the surname include:

 Carla Accardi (1924–2014), Italian painter
 Gimena Accardi (born 1985), Argentine actress, model and occasional singer
 Jimmi Accardi, American musician, songwriter, and music producer
 Maria T. Accardi, academic in the field of library science
 Millicent Borges Accardi, Portuguese-American poet
 Pietro Accardi (born 1982), retired Italian footballer
 Settimo Accardi (1902–1977), Sicilian-American mobster
 Ugo Attardi (1923–2006), Italian painter, sculptor and writer
 Vincent Accardi (born 1982), American musician

References 

Italian-language surnames